Sullua Fjord is a fjord of Greenland. It is located in the Upernavik Archipelago.

Geography
The fjord is oriented in a roughly NE/SW direction, to the southwest the fjord opens into the Baffin Bay of the North Atlantic Ocean. To the west lies the Innerit and to the east the Sigguup Nunaa Peninsula.

See also
List of fjords of Greenland

References
 

Fjords of the Upernavik Archipelago